KB Mashinostroyeniya or KBM for short is a state defence enterprise, scientific and design R&D centre specialised in missile systems located in Kolomna, Moscow region, Russia. Part of Rostec state corporation.

KBM was founded on 11 April 1942 by order 1576 of the State Defence Committee for the mortar designs. Its first chief was Boris Shavyrin. The company was awarded the Order of Lenin and the Order of Labour Red Banner.

Former names include SKB-101, SKB-GA. The company is also sometimes known as Kolomna Mechanical Engineering Design Bureau .

The company is part of the High Precision Systems group.

Its main constructors were Sergey Nepobedimiy and Andranik Ter-Stepaniyan.

V. M. Sokolov is currently the Chief and General Designer.

Products

KBM produced more than 80% of all mortar types in USSR. Also, designed:

Anti-aircraft defence systems 
 Gibka-S self-propelled air defense system.
 Anti-tank recoilless rifles B-10 and B-11
 Man-portable air-defense systems
 9K333 Verba / Верба
 9K38 Igla (SA-18 "Grouse") / Игла
 9K32 Strela-2 and 9K32M Strela-2M (SA-7 and SA-7b "Grail") / Стрела-2
 9K34 Strela-3 (SA-14 "Gremlin") / Стрела-3
 Dzhigit / Джигит
 Strelets / Стрелец
 Anti-tank missile systems
 Shmel / Шмель
 Malyutka (AT-3 "Sagger") / Малютка
 9M114 Shturm (AT-6 "Spiral") / Штурм
 9M120 Ataka (AT-9 "Spiral-2") / Атака
 9M123 Khrizantema (AT-15 "Springer") / Хризантема
 Theatre ballistic missiles
 R-400 Oka / Ока
 OTR-21 Tochka / ОТРК Точка, Точка-У
 Iskander, Iskander-M, Iskander-E / ОТРК Искандер, Искандер-М, Искандер-Э
 Active Protection Systems:
 KAZ Arena, Arena-E Арена-Э

References

External links
 Official website of KBM

Guided missile manufacturers
Defence companies of the Soviet Union
Research institutes in the Soviet Union
High Precision Systems
Companies based in Moscow Oblast
1942 establishments in the Soviet Union
Design bureaus